Tibetan grammar describes the morphology, syntax and other grammatical features of Lhasa Tibetan, a Sino-Tibetan language. Lhasa Tibetan is typologically an ergative–absolutive language. Nouns are generally unmarked for grammatical number, but are marked for case. Adjectives are never marked and appear after the noun. Demonstratives also come after the noun but these are marked for number. Verbs are possibly the most complicated part of Tibetan grammar in terms of morphology. The dialect described here is the colloquial language of Central Tibet, especially Lhasa and the surrounding area, but the spelling used reflects classical Tibetan, not the colloquial pronunciation.

Nouns and case
Nouns are not usually marked for grammatical gender or number.

Natural gender may be conveyed through the lexicon, e.g. "yak (male),"  "yak-cow." In human or animate nouns, gender may be indicated through suffixes.

Number is never marked in inanimate nouns or animals. Even human nouns can only take the plural marker  if they are specified or definite, e.g.  "mother" →  "(the) mothers." Tibetan does not mark definiteness, and such a meaning would be left to be deduced from the context.

Tibetan nouns are marked for six cases: absolutive, agentive, genitive, ablative, associative and oblique. Particles are attached to entire noun phrases, not to individual nouns. Case suffixes are attached to the noun phrase as a whole, while the actual noun remains unchanged. The form taken by the suffix depends on the final sound of the word to which the suffix is attached.

Absolutive case
The absolutive case is the unmarked form of the noun, which may be used as the subject of an intransitive verb, the object of a transitive verb or the experiencer of an emotion.

Genitive case
The genitive case marks possession and is often translated as "of." The form of the genitive suffix depends on the last sound of the noun:

 if the last sound is a vowel or  then the suffix is 

The genitive is also used to form relative clauses. Here, the genitive suffix is attached to the verb and is translated as "that" or "who."

Agentive case
Formally the agentive (or ergative) case is built upon the genitive by adding  to the latter; consequently:

 if the last sound is a vowel or  then the suffix is 

The agentive is used for ergative and instrumental functions. The ergative function occurs with the subject, agent or causer of transitive verbs, the agent of "mental" and "verbal" actions and the perceiver of a sensation.

Ablative case
It marks direction away from the noun. Like the agentive case, the ablative can also take the ergative role marking the agent of an action.

Associative case
The associative case is marked by the suffix , which may be translated as "and" but also as "with," "against" or have no translation at all.  When speaking, after the associative suffix is used, a pause is inserted, for example:

The associative suffix cannot combine with other case or plural markers on the same noun or noun phrase:

Oblique case
The oblique suffix fulfills the functions of both the dative and locative cases. The dative case marks the indirect object of an action and can be translated as "to." The locative case marks place, with or without movement, or time, and can be translated as "on," "in," "at" or "to."

There are two varieties of the suffix, one of which is dependent on the final sound of the noun and one that is not. The form  is found only after vowels and  whereas  can be found after all sounds including vowels and <'a>. The <-r> form is rarely used to mark the dative with monosyllabic words except the personal pronouns and demonstrative and interrogative adjectives.

Pronouns

Personal pronouns
Pronouns have between one and three registers and three numbers: singular, dual and plural.

Demonstrative pronouns

, on the other hand, can only express spatial distance. From these demonstrative pronouns the following adverbs are derived:  "here,"  "there," and  "over there."

The demonstratives can be used as both pronouns and adjectives. As pronouns they act much in the same way as the third person pronouns do, but may also refer to previous clauses or events. As adjectives they appear after the noun and act as any other adjective would. Both adjectival and pronominal demonstratives are capable of receiving both case and number suffixes.

Verb classes

Volitional and non-volitional classes
There is an important division of verbs into two main classes: volitional and non-volitional. The former concerns controllable actions, and the latter non-controllable actions. This difference is comparable to that in English between look and see, and between listen and hear: listen and look are volitional because one can choose to do them or not, while see and hear are non-volitional because they do not denote deliberate actions. These two classes are important when conjugating any Tibetan verb because each class can only use a particular set of suffixes. This means that volitional verbs cannot use the same suffixes as non-volitional verbs and vice versa. For example, the verb form  would be incorrect as <mthong> is a non-volitional verb and <pa-yin> is a volitional suffix. The correct form would be  or "I saw."

Transitive and intransitive verbs
Both the volitional and non-volitional classes contain transitive as well as intransitive verbs. The forms of transitive and intransitive verbs remain the same if the two verbs share the same root. The difference between transitive and intransitive is only evident in the way each verb is used: if the verb takes an object then it is transitive, if it does not then it is intransitive. This distinction determines which case the nouns will take.

Verb inflection
Verbs in modern spoken Tibetan have between one and three stems. These are the present-future stem, the past stem and the imperative stem. Many verbs, however, only have one stem when spoken, remaining distinct only in writing, meaning that inflection is based mainly on the use of verbal auxiliaries. The verb is inflected by means of attaching suffixes to the verb stem in a similar way to nouns and pronouns.

Copulae 
Tibetan has several verbs that can be translated as "to be" or "to have" which appear in two classes. Copulas in the first class are essential, meaning that they denote an essential quality of the noun. Copulas in the second class are existential, meaning that they express the existence of a phenomenon or a characteristic and suggests an evaluation by the speaker. The difference between essential and existential copulas is similar to that of the verbs estar and ser in the Spanish language.

Essential copulae 
There are three essential copulas: assertive , revelatory , and egophoric

Essential-assertive copula
 is the "assertive" essential copula. It translates as "to be" and represents an objective assertion or affirmation regarding the subject of the sentence. The attribute may be an adjective, giving an attributive meaning, or a substantive, giving an equative meaning. The attributive immediately precedes the verb.

This copula, in rare cases, may also express possession of a quality:

Essential-revelatory copula
 is the "revelatory" copula, meaning that the speaker has only recently become aware of what they are stating. It may be translated as "to be" with the statement preceded by an exclamation such as "Hey!" or "Why!"

Essential-egophoric copula
 is the "egophoric" essential copula. It is usually translated as "(I) am" because of its main use with the first person. Like རེད་ <red>, it can be used with adjectives or substantives.

 may, on rare occasions, express an intention or an insistence on the part of the speaker:

Existential copulas 
There are three existential copulas: assertive , testimonial  and egophoric .

Existential-assertive copula 
 is the "assertive" copula. This copula is used with the second and third person pronouns and implies a definite assertion by the speaker. It can usually be translated three ways according to context; "there is/are," giving an existential sense, "to be at," giving a certain location (situational sense) or by the verb "to have," giving a possessive sense.

It can also be preceded by a qualifying adjective to form the attributive sense in which it can be translated as "to be."

Existential-testimonial copula 
 is the "testimonial" copula. It implies that the speaker was a witness to what is being stated.

It can also, like  be preceded by a qualifying adjective to form the attributive sense in which it can be translated as "to be."

Existential-egophoric copula 
 is the "egophoric" copula. Like  it is associated with the first person but it instead marks possession (I have) and location (I am (at)). It may also be used to express the speaker's opinion of something or an acquaintance with something.

References

 (Original from Oxford University)
 (Original from Harvard University)
 (Original from Harvard University)
 (Original from Harvard University)
 (Original from Oxford University)
 . " ... contains a facsimile of the original publication in manuscript, the first printed version of 1883, and the later Addenda published with the Third Edition."—P. [4] of cover./ First edition published in Kye-Lang in Brit. Lahoul by the author, in manuscript, in 1865.
 Naga, Sangye Tandar. (2010). "Some Reflections on the Mysterious Nature of Tibetan Language" In: The Tibet Journal, Special issue. Autumn 2009 vol XXXIV n. 3-Summer 2010 vol XXXV n. 2. "The Earth Ox Papers", edited by Roberto Vitali, pp. 561–566.
 . 
 . (Reprint of the Calcutta : Bengal Secretariat Book Depot, 1902 edition.) 
 .
 

ESS:essential
ASSERT:assertive
REV:revelatory
EGO:egophoric
TEST:testimonial

Sino-Tibetan grammars
Tibetan language